Velaikkaran is a 1987 Indian Tamil-language action comedy film directed by S. P. Muthuraman, starring Rajinikanth, Sarath Babu, Amala and Pallavi. It is a remake of the 1982 Hindi film Namak Halaal. The film was released on 7 March 1987 and became a box office success.

Plot 

Ragupathy was brought up by his paternal grandfather, Valayapathy. He decides to go to the city in search of a new job and life. In the city he meets Vaiyapuri, who guides him into an interview in a 5-star hotel owned by Rajkumar. While in the hotel, Ragupathy meets Kowsalya and falls in love with her, and Rajkumar falls in love with Nisha. During this time, many attempts are made to kill Rajkumar by his uncle and son Pounraj. The blame for this murder attaches to Rajkumar's mother Savithri, who is actually Ragupathy's mother. Realising all this, Ragupathy takes an oath that he will not let harm come to Rajkumar.

Cast 
 Rajinikanth as Ragupathy
 Sarath Babu as Rajkumar
 Pallavi as Nisha
 Amala as Kowsalya
 K. R. Vijaya as Savithri
 Srikanth as Ragupathy's father
 Achamillai Gopi as Kowsalya's blind brother
 Nassar as Pounraj
 R. N. Sudarshan
 V. K. Ramasamy as Valayapathy
 Delhi Ganesh
 Senthil as Vaiyapuri
 Shihan Hussaini
 A. Sakunthala
Bayilvan Ranganathan 
 Pyramid Natarajan

Production 
Rajinikanth acted without taking any remuneration, due to the losses the producers suffered from Sri Raghavendrar (1985).

Soundtrack 
The soundtrack was composed by Ilaiyaraaja, with lyrics by Mu. Metha. This is the first film where Mano sang for Rajinikanth. The song "Vaa Vaa Kanna" is set in Hamsadhvani raga.

Release and reception 
Velaikkaran was released on 7 March 1987. The Indian Express called it "pretty run of the mill stuff". Jayamanmadhan of Kalki criticised the story. The film became a box office success, and Rajinikanth won the Sunflash Award for Best Actor.

References

Bibliography

External links 

1980s action comedy films
1980s Tamil-language films
1987 comedy films
1987 films
Films directed by S. P. Muthuraman
Films scored by Ilaiyaraaja
Indian action comedy films
Tamil remakes of Hindi films